The Hiram Poetry Review is an American literary magazine founded in 1966 by Hiram College English professor Hale Chatfield. It is published annually. The journal publishes original poetry, poetry reviews and interviews with established poets. Work that has been published in the Hiram Poetry Review has been reprinted in the Pushcart Prize Anthology.  The journal played an important role in establishing the career of Charles Bukowski, whose work appeared frequently in the journal between 1966 and 1969. The Review and its editor in chief, Hale Chatfield, were also instrumental in the posthumous publication of the works of Henry Dumas, one of Chatfield's fellow students at Rutgers.

Notable contributors

 
Jacob M. Appel
Russell Banks 
Charles Bukowski
Lyn Coffin
Henry Dumas
Norman Hoegberg

Christina Kallery
Robert Lax 
Virgil Suarez 
Don Winter

See also
List of literary magazines

References

External links
Hiram Poetry Review

Annual magazines published in the United States
Hiram College
Magazines established in 1966
Magazines published in Ohio
Poetry magazines published in the United States